Sodston Manor is a heritage listed Victorian manor house located near Narberth, Pembrokeshire, Wales. It is currently run as a private secondary school, Castle School Pembrokeshire.

History
The house was built circa 1860 for Sir Alfred Ernle Montacute-Chatfield. It was designed in a plain Italianate style, on a square plan, with two above-ground storeys and a basement.

The interior had an entrance hall with a staircase including barley twist balusters. A servants hall was connected to a basement kitchen via a separate staircase.

The house became Grade II listed in 1988.

Castle School
In September 2015 a private secondary school of 97 pupils and 23 staff relocated to Sodston Manor. Castle School was founded in 2009 by Harriet Harrison and had previously operated from a primary school building in Cresselly. Sodston Manor was bought for £270,000 and Harrison spent a further £230,000 on repairs and refurbishment. When it arrived the school opened a Sixth Form.

References

External links
Castle School website

Grade II listed buildings in Pembrokeshire
Narberth, Pembrokeshire
Country houses in Pembrokeshire
Manor houses in Wales